Muzzle rise, muzzle flip or muzzle climb refers to the tendency of a firearm's or airgun's muzzle (front end of the barrel) to rise up after firing.  It more specifically refers to the seemingly unpredictable "jump" of the firearm's muzzle, caused by combined recoil from multiple shots being fired in quick succession.  It has an adverse effect on maintaining accuracy with using automatic weapons or rapid-firing semi-automatic firearms, as a moving muzzle can throw off the shooter's aim, causing subsequent shots to miss the intended target.

Reason 
The primary reason for muzzle rise is that for nearly all guns, the bore axis (longitudinal centerline of the barrel) is above the gun's center of mass, while the contact points between the shooter and the gun (e.g. grips and stock) are often all below the center of mass. When the gun is fired, the bullet motion and the escaping propellant gases exert a reactional recoil directly backwards along the bore axis, while the countering forward push from the shooter's hands and body are well below it.  This creates a rotational couple, exerting a torque around the center of mass that causes the gun to pitch upwards, causing the muzzle to elevate.

Muzzle rise can be reduced, though generally only through trading off other qualities. Methods include
 adding more ergonomic contact points (such as a sling, an "inline"-style buttstock, or a foregrip), or employing a "thumb-over-bore" grip, for more efficient exertion of anti-recoil forces
 reducing the vertical distance between the barrel and the contact points
 lowering the recoil by using less powerful cartridges
 lowering the recoil by lowering the rate of fire of fully automatic weapons, or supplanting the full-auto mode with burst firing
 lowering the backward recoil with devices such as muzzle brakes, which vector away part of the overall recoil
 lowering the recoil with a suppressor, which slows down the escaping propellant gas and reduces the backward recoil force
 compensating for the couple using a recoil compensator, a ported barrel or other asymmetric muzzle fixtures, which vector some of the propellant gas upwards to create a reactional downward torque on the muzzle
 increasing the moment of inertia by attaching additional weight to the muzzle end; it is unusual to do this expressly, although a suppressor or compensator accomplishes it as a collateral effect
 increasing the rate of fire of burst-fired firearms to give the muzzle rise less time to affect the shot placements

Designs 
A number of firearms have been designed specifically to address the issue of muzzle rise.  The Jatimatic submachine gun is an example of a firearm where the bore axis is inclined against the bolt and the rest of the firearm in order to redirect the recoil force slightly upwards.
The KRISS Vector submachine gun uses a more elaborate mechanical articulated mechanism which allows the block and bolt to recoil not just rearward like most other firearms, but back and then 'vectored' down off-axis along a rail system behind the weapon's magazine well to reduce muzzle rise and felt recoil.

The Hudson H9, introduced in 2017, is based on the M1911 but has the recoil spring down in front of the trigger guard, resulting in a barrel very close to the top of the shooter's grip, with the creator claiming that, "the recoil impulse from that recoil spring is directed into the meat of your hand."

Gallery

References

External links
GunTweaks.com - Handgun Recoil Characteristics and Lowering Felt Recoil
 .45 ACP Revolver vs Pistol Recoil Slow Motion video

Firearm terminology